William John Ansell (4 August 1921 – 22 April 2008), more commonly known as Jack Ansell, was an English footballer who played for Bletchley Brick Works, Northampton Town and Oxford United. During his spell at Northampton, he played 105 consecutive league and cup games, before a broken leg ended the run. He died on 22 April 2008.

References

External links
Rage Online profile

1921 births
2008 deaths
English footballers
Association football goalkeepers
Northampton Town F.C. players
Oxford United F.C. players
English Football League players
People from Newport Pagnell